Stephen Graham (born June 11, 1982) is an American former professional basketball player  coach. Graham's twin brother, Joey, was his college teammate and has also played in the NBA. He is currently a player development coach with the Denver Nuggets.

High school and college career
Born in Wilmington, Delaware, Graham played competitively at Florida's Brandon High School, and was team captain his senior year in which he averaged 16 points, 8 rebounds and 6 assists per game; in that year, he and his brother Joey led Brandon to the state finals. Graham was named to Hillsborough County's All-Conference team his junior year and to the All-State team his senior season. He played in the AAU's Junior Olympics National Game and was named an All-American. He was a member of both Tampa's championship AAU Sunshine State Games' team, and Nike's traveling Florida team. He was recruited by South Florida, Richmond, Florida State and Florida.

Graham spent his freshman and sophomore college basketball seasons (2000–01; 2001–02) with the University of Central Florida Knights, then transferred to Oklahoma State University for his junior year (2002–03) in which he redshirted. In his first season with the Cowboys in 2003–04, he only twice scored 12 points, his season-high. He averaged a mere 2.8 points, 1.4 rebounds and 0.7 assists per game overall, but he was named first-team Academic All-Big 12 for his academic achievements. A highlight in his senior season in 2004–05 was leading the Cowboys with 22 points in a 78–75 home loss to Gonzaga on December 28, 2004. For his second and final season for Oklahoma State, he averaged 6.5 points, 3.2 rebounds and 1.1 assists per game.

Professional career
After playing through his senior year with the Oklahoma State Cowboys, Graham declared for the 2005 NBA draft. However, he was not selected. He played for the Phoenix Suns in the Las Vegas Summer League, and then for the San Antonio Spurs during the 2005 preseason, but was not offered a longer contract by either team. He then joined the CBA, a minor league, signing with the Sioux Falls Skyforce. Graham was signed by the NBA's Houston Rockets on December 10, 2005, but was cut on December 29 after playing in six games.

After returning to the Skyforce in the interim, he signed a 10-day contract with the Chicago Bulls on January 17, 2006. He played his first game in a Bulls uniform three days later against the Rockets. However, Graham saw limited playing time with the Bulls and his contract was not extended when it expired.

On February 6, Graham was signed to a 10-day contract by the Cleveland Cavaliers. On February 20, he was signed to a second 10-day contract, then for the rest of the season.

He spent the first two months of the 2006–07 NBA season with the Portland Trail Blazers, but was waived on January 2, 2007, playing with an old acquaintance, the Skyforce in South Dakota, who were now a part of the D-League.

In July 2007, he signed with the Indiana Pacers.

He signed with the Charlotte Bobcats in September 2009.

On September 15, 2010, Graham signed with the New Jersey Nets. The Nets waived Graham on December 22, 2011, following the lockout.

On March 13, 2012, Graham was acquired by the Fort Wayne Mad Ants.

On September 30, 2013, Graham signed with the Milwaukee Bucks. However, he was waived on October 26.

On December 21, 2013, Graham signed with Guaros de Lara.

Graham competes for the Ants Alumni in The Basketball Tournament. He was a forward on the 2015 team who made it to the semifinals, falling 87–76 to Team 23.

Coaching career
On October 21, 2015, he was hired by the Fort Wayne Mad Ants to work as an assistant coach.

He was announced as a player development coach for the Denver Nuggets for the 2016–17 season.

NBA career statistics

Regular season 

|-
| align="left" | 
| align="left" | Houston
| 6 || 0 || 6.3 || .375 || .200 || 1.000 || 1.2 || .5 || .3 || .0 || 2.8
|-
| align="left" | 
| align="left" | Chicago
| 3 || 0 || 6.7 || .200 || .250 || 1.000 || 1.0 || .3 || .0 || .0 || 1.7
|-
| align="left" | 
| align="left" | Cleveland
| 13 || 0 || 9.0 || .424 || .000 || .889 || 1.3 || .2 || .2 || .2 || 2.8
|-
| align="left" | 
| align="left" | Portland
| 14 || 1 || 11.8 || .425 || .273 || .889 || 1.5 || .4 || .3 || .1 || 3.2
|-
| align="left" | 
| align="left" | Indiana
| 22 || 0 || 5.8 || .586 || .500 || .750 || 1.0 || .4 || .2 || .0 || 4.0
|-
| align="left" | 
| align="left" | Indiana
| 52 || 6 || 13.2 || .414 || .303 || .806 || 1.8 || .6 || .2 || .1 || 5.4
|-
| align="left" | 
| align="left" | Charlotte
| 70 || 8 || 11.5 || .496 || .320 || .646 || 1.9 || .3 || .3 || .1 || 4.2
|-
| align="left" | 
| align="left" | New Jersey
| 59 || 28 || 16.3 || .405 || .238 || .816 || 2.1 || .7 || .2 || .0 || 3.4
|- class="sortbottom"
| style="text-align:center;" colspan="2"| Career
| 239 || 43 || 12.2 || .446 || .308 || .766 || 1.8 || .5 || .2 || .1 || 4.0

Playoffs

|-
| align="left" | 2010
| align="left" | Charlotte
| 2 || 0 || 2.5 || .000 || .000 || .000 || .0 || .5 || .5 || .0 || .0
|- class="sortbottom"
| style="text-align:center;" colspan="2"| Career
| 2 || 0 || 2.5 || .000 || .000 || .000 || .0 || .5 || .5 || .0 || .0

References

External links
NBA.com Profile
Luke Winn on the Graham brothers' career at Oklahoma State
An article concerning the influence of Graham's family on him

1982 births
Living people
20th-century African-American people
21st-century African-American sportspeople
African-American basketball players
American men's basketball players
Basketball players from Wilmington, Delaware
Charlotte Bobcats players
Chicago Bulls players
Cleveland Cavaliers players
Denver Nuggets assistant coaches
Fort Wayne Mad Ants coaches
Fort Wayne Mad Ants players
Guaros de Lara (basketball) players
Houston Rockets players
Indiana Pacers players
New Jersey Nets players
Oklahoma State Cowboys basketball players
Portland Trail Blazers players
Shooting guards
Sioux Falls Skyforce (CBA) players
Sioux Falls Skyforce players
Small forwards
American twins
Twin sportspeople
UCF Knights men's basketball players
Undrafted National Basketball Association players